The 2020 Italian GT Championship was the 29th season of the Italian GT Championship, the grand tourer-style sports car racing founded by the Italian automobile club (Automobile Club d'Italia). The Championship consists of four Sprint race events and four Endurance race events. At each Sprint race event there were held two races. The Season started on 19 July at Mugello and ended on 6 December at Vallelunga

Teams and Drivers

GT3

GT Cup

GT4

Race calendar and results
All races were held in Italy. Overall winner is Bold.

Standings

Endurance Cup

The worst result doesn't count towards the championship.

Overall

GT3 Pro-Am

GT4 Pro-Am

GT4 Am

Sprint

The worst two results don't count towards the championship.

Overall

GT3 Pro-Am

GT3 Am

GT Cup

GT4 Pro-Am

GT4 Am

References

Italian Motorsports Championships
Italian GT Championship